Sicariomorpha is a genus of spiders in the family Oonopidae. It was first described in 2015 by Ott & Harvey. , it contains only one species, Sicariomorpha maschwitzi, found in Malaysia.

References

Oonopidae
Monotypic Araneomorphae genera
Spiders of Asia